Jack Cooper may refer to:

Arts and entertainment
 Jack L. Cooper (1888–1970), first African-American radio DJ
 Jackie Cooper (1922–2011), actor and film director
 Jack Cooper (American musician) (born 1963), composer, arranger, orchestrator, multireedist and music educator
 Jack Cooper (English musician) (born 1980), musician, member of Ultimate Painting, Mazes and The Beep Seals

Sports
 Jack Cooper (Australian rules footballer, born 1889) (1889–1917), Australian rules footballer for Fitzroy
 Jack Cooper (Australian rules footballer, born 1911) (1911–1996), Australian rules footballer for Carlton
 Jack Cooper (Australian rules footballer, born 1922) (1922–2003), Australian rules footballer for Carlton
 Jack Cooper (English footballer) (1889–?), English football goalkeeper
 Jack A. Cooper, English athlete

Other
 Jack Cooper, businessman who owned Cooper Canada
 Jack Cooper, Baron Cooper of Stockton Heath (1908–1988), British politician & activist

See also
 John Cooper (disambiguation)
 Johnny Cooper (disambiguation)
 Jacki Cooper (born 1967), musician